Kalateh-ye Kermani (also Romanized as Kalāteh-ye Kermānī; also known as Espahnū) is a village in Momenabad Rural District, in the Central District of Sarbisheh County, South Khorasan Province, Iran. At the 2006 census, its population was 88, in 22 families.

References 

Populated places in Sarbisheh County